Madhan Karky Vairamuthu is an Indian lyricist, screenwriter, research associate, software engineer, and entrepreneur. A holder of a doctorate in computer science from the University of Queensland, Karky began his professional career as an assistant professor at the College of Engineering, Guindy, and soon after ventured into the Tamil film industry, working as a lyricist and dialogue writer. He resigned from his teaching profession in early 2013 and began working full-time in the film industry, while also launching the Karky Research Foundation (KaReFo), an educational research organization which primarily focuses on language computing and language literacy. He also founded the Mellinam Education, which develops educational games and story books designed to propagate learning among children, and DooPaaDoo, an online music platform which promotes independent music and serves a distributor for film soundtracks.

Early life
Karky is the eldest son of seven-times National Award winning lyricist Vairamuthu and Ponmani, a Tamil scholar and veteran professor at the Meenakshi College for Women. He has a younger brother, Kabilan, who is a novelist and also works as a lyricist and dialogue writer for Tamil films.

Education
He grew up in Chennai and was educated at the Loyala Matriculation School in Kodambakkam. By his own admission, he was not a good student, excelling primarily only in Tamil and English. During his time in high school, he gained an interest in computer science He got admission in College of Engineering, Guindy which is affiliated with the Anna University. He began his undergraduate education in the field of Computer engineering in the year 1997.

While in CEG, as part of his final year project, Karky developed a program called the Tamil Voice Engine, under the supervision of Professor T.V. Geetha. The goal of the project was construction of a text to speech engine for the Tamil language. The research paper on the project was officially selected at the Tamil Internet Conference in  Kuala Lumpur, Malaysia.

Other projects during his tenure include the Name Generator, which was part of his course on Creativity, Innovation and New Product Development (the objective being to generate random names that are pronounceable with respect to Indian phonetics) and Compiler Design, for which a high level programming language was conceived, with the goal of proper specification and interpretation of lexical rules and grammar rules.

For Chennai Kavigal, he created a Spell Checker for a Tamil Word Processor. The project involved a lot of Natural Language Processing elements, based on a root dictionary built as a part of the morphological analyzer for the Tamil Language. The endgame being determining the correctness of words.

Following the completion of his bachelor's degree in 2001, Karky began his master's degree at the University of Queensland in the year 2003. In that particular stint, he developed a project based on the theory of computation and strong mathematics (under the supervision of Dr. George Havas). It aimed at analyzing an existing algorithm of reducing any kind of matrix format to a standard format called 'Hermite Normal form', which is a unit upper triangular matrix.

Some of his other projects during this course include the Disciplined Software Process Project (whose objective was to introduce and practice the software development process for individuals called Personal Software Process), the On-Line Art Store Website (which involved the creation of a website that trades paintings through the Internet) and the Text Based Voice Chat (for which a Proxy Voice Chat system was designed and developed in Visual Basic that incorporated the predominant computing aspects).

In addition to his academics, Karky also served as Academic tutor at the university. He conducted class room tutorials and laboratory sessions on subjects such as Relational Database Systems and Programming Languages.

As part of his PhD program on information technology, he developed a Java-based simulation platform called SENSE (Simulated Environment of Networked Sensor Experiments), to test different heuristics. This project was done under the guidance of Dr. Maria Orlowska and Dr. Shazia Sadiq. His thesis is titled "Design considerations for query dissemination in wireless sensor networks".

Teaching career

Upon his return to India following the completion of his post-graduation, Karky returned to CEG Anna University in December 2007. He was a Senior Research Fellow for the next six months, managing research projects as well as multiple student projects at an undergrad and postgrad levels. In addition to those, he handled courses and labs for students who pursued their master's degrees. He also served as a Project Scientist between July 2008 and July 2009, managing projects of research groups as well as ME & MBA students.

Starting from August 2009, he began his role as an assistant professor. He lectured Computer Science students who were pursuing their Bachelors and master's degrees as well as coordinated the Tamil Computing Lab at the university. He also served as counsellor for NRI and foreign national students, as well as the Staff treasurer of Computer Science Engineering Association. Some of the subjects he taught include Advanced Databases, Ethics for Engineers, Principles of Programming Languages, Environmental Science and Tamil Computing (for PhD students).

Family and personal life

Karky's been married to Nandini Eswaramoorthy, a fellow alum at Anna University, since June 22, 2008. Nandini Karky now works in the Tamil film industry as a subtitler for feature films and documentaries. They have a son named Haiku Karky, who was born in 2009.

Film career

Debut

During his teaching stint at Anna University, Karky also began his career in the Tamil film industry with the science-fiction film Enthiran (2010), the magnum opus of director Shankar. Karky had approached the director in 2008 with some of the songs he had written, and was brought him on board to help with the dialogues of the film, especially assisting with technical terminology. He stated that there were three sets of dialogues written for almost every scene of the film; one by Shankar, one by Karky, and the other by the late Sujatha, a frequent collaborator with the director who had died during the early stages of the film's pre-production. Shankar would go through all the three drafts and implement those that fit best. The climax was the only portion that didn't have multiple hands, as it was written solely by Karky.

In addition to the dialogue, Karky wrote 2 songs for the film, as well: "Irumbile oru Irudhaiyam" (the first song of his career, which was partially crooned by A.R. Rahman) and "Boom Boom Robo Da". However, Kanden Kadhalai (2009), in which he had written the song "Ododi Poren" (composed by Vidyasagar), became his first release. For his work on Enthiran, Karky was named Best Find of the Year at the 2011 Vijay Awards.

Lyric writer

Following his work on Enthiran, Karky became one of the most sought after lyricists in the Tamil film industry, having multiple collaborations with A.R. Rahman, Harris Jayaraj, G. V. Prakash Kumar, D. Imman, M.M. Keeravani, Yuvan Shankar Raja, S. Thaman, Sanjay Leela Bhansali, Anirudh Ravichander and Sam CS. In addition to his native Tamil, he is known for penning songs in multiple languages; some of which include "Asku Laska" from Nanban (which features 16 different languages), "The Rise of Damo" from 7aum Arivu (written in Mandarin) and "Continua" from Nootrenbadhu (in Portuguese). His work is also characterized by infusing uncommon Tamil words that aren't normally used in everyday lexicon, as part of lyrics (like "Kuviyamillaa Kaatchi Paezhai" from Ko and "Panikoozh" from I). He also wrote the first palindrome song in Tamil cinema for the film Vinodhan. As of the end of 2018, he has over six hundred songs to his credit.

Some of Karky's most popular songs include "Irumbile oru Irudhaiyam" (Enthiran), "Enamo Edho" (Ko), "Nee Koorinal" (Nootrenbadhu), "Asku Laska" (Nanban), "Google Google" (Thuppakki), "Elay Keechaan" (Kadal), "Osakka" (Vanakkam Chennai), "Selfie Pulla" (Kaththi), "Pookkalae Sattru Oyivedungal" (I), "Mei Nigara" (24), "Azhagiye" (Kaatru Veliyidai), "Endhira Logathu Sundariye" (2.0) and "Kurumba" (Tik Tik Tik).

Dialogue writer

On the heels of the success with Enthiran, Karky once again collaborated as a dialogue writer with director Shankar for Nanban. An adaptation of the Hindi blockbuster 3 Idiots, he infused a twang to the dialogue that aimed to showcase college life in a different manner. He also collaborated as a technical advisor with Shankar with 2.0 (the sequel to Enthiran).

Karky's also known for his successful collaboration with Telugu director S.S. Rajamouli, on his two-part magnum opus Baahubali; the second part being the most profitable South Indian film of all time, and RRR. His other notable projects as a dialogue writer include Gokul's Idharkuthane Aasaipattai Balakumara, Venkat Prabhu's Massu Engira Masilamani, and Nag Ashwin's Mahanati (a biopic of legendary South Indian film actress Savitri).

Linguist

For the Baahubali series, Karky created a language called "Kiliki", which was spoken by the Kalakeya tribe in the film. The genesis of the language was laid during his time in Australia, where he also worked part-time as a babysitter and created a language called "Click" for the purpose of inventing a new language along with kids. When approached by director Rajamouli to have a language which sounded fear-inducing, he pitched to create a language of his own. Using "Click" as a base, he added about 750 words and 40 grammar rules, and named the language "Kiliki". Verbal clicks such as 'tch' and 'tsk' are used as tense and plural markers in the language. Phonetic reversals were also heavily used for opposite words ('min' for "I", 'nim' for "you"). The language doesn't have words that stand-in for remorse, as the characters who speak it in the film do not exude that quality.

Top grossing films

In his first decade as a lyricist and dialogue writer, Karky has been part of some of the biggest blockbusters in modern Indian cinema such as Enthiran (2010), Ko (2011), Naan Ee (2012), Thuppakki (2012), Kaththi (2014), I (2015), Bajirao Mastani (2015), the Baahubali series (2015; 2017), Nadigaiyar Thilagam (2018), Padmaavat (2018), 2.0 (2018) and RRR (2022).

Other ventures

Karky Research Foundation
After resigning from his teaching position at Anna University in January 2013, Karky along with his wife Nandini Karky founded KaReFo, the Karky Research Foundation, a non-profit educational research organization which focuses on language computing and language literacy. He serves as the Research Head for the organization.

The projects developed by KaReFo include "Chol" (an online Tamil-English-Tamil dictionary), "Piripori" (a morphological analyser and compound word splitter for Tamil), "Olingoa" (a transliteration tool), "Paeri" (a name generator that produces around 9 crore male/female names based on Tamil phonetics), "Emoni" (a rhyme finder tool), "Kural" (a Thirukural portal), "eN" (a number to text converter), "Paadal" (a Tamil lyric portal to research and browse song lyrics) and "Aadugalam" (a portal for word games).

For the work done by the organization on "Piripori", Karky was felicitated with the Chief Minister award for Computing in February 2019.

Mellinam Education
In November 2008, Karky founded the Mellinam Education and serves as its Director. The organization specializes in content creation for children's educational tools such as books and games, which aims to introduce the Tamil language and incite interest in children to explore science and innovations in Tamil literature.

Their products are branded under the name "iPaatti" and they include song books, stories, word games and sentence games for children. Some of the projects in development include toys and electronic games.

Contribution to indie music

DooPaaDoo
In April 2016, Karky launched DooPaaDoo, an online music platform, along with his friend Kauntheya, to promote independent and non-film music. His intention to create a song bank containing music not created exclusively for films, which could be presented to producers and directors who had the option to pick the ones they feel suited with their projects. In addition to serving as a label for independent music, DooPaaDoo serves a distributor for soundtracks to Tamil films.

The first song released in the platform was composed by M.S. Viswanathan. Over 60 top composers from the Tamil film industry were hired to provide content for the platform, which aimed to release one song every day.

Karky also served as radio jockey for the show Big DooPaaDoo on the radio station Big FM 92.7, which aired on Saturdays between 6 and 9 PM.

In addition to serving as the director for the DooPaaDoo, Karky has personally penned several songs for the platform, collaborating with prominent and independent figures in the music industry such as Srinivas, Karthik, Anil Srinivasan, Rizwan, Karthikeya Murthy, Vijay Prakash, Andrea Jeremiah, Aj Alimirzaq, and director Gautham Vasudev Menon (who also directed three music videos for songs written by Karky, which featured actors Tovino Thomas, Dhivyadharshini, Aishwarya Rajesh and Atharvaa). Some of the prominent indie songs written by Karky include "Ulaviravu", "Koova", "Bodhai Kodhai", "Yaavum Inidhe", "Edho Oar Araiyil", "Kaadhal Thozhi" and "Periyar Kuthu".

Sundays with Anil and Karky
Karky also served as co-anchor with pianist Anil Srinivasan on the musical reality talk show Sundays with Anil and Karky, which aired on  Zee Tamil HD for 13 episodes between December 2017 and April 2018. The program featured celebrity guests both from within the music field as well as other segments of the entertainment industry, and showcase composition and performance of music. Some of the prominent guests in the show's run include composers Sean Roldan, G.V. Prakash Kumar and Srinivas; directors Venkat Prabhu, Vasanth, Gautham Menon and Rajiv Menon; actors Siddharth, RJ Balaji and Khushbu; and singers Karthik, Andrea Jeremiah, Gana Bala and Saindhavi.

Filmography

As a lyricist

As a dialogue writer

Television

Awards and nominations

Filmfare Awards South: Best Lyricist - Tamil
2012: "Nee Koorinal" from Nootrenbadhu: Nominated
2013: "Veesum" from Naan Ee; "Google Google" from Thuppakki: Nominated
2014: "Anbin Vasale" from Kadal: Nominated
2015: "Selfie Pulla" from Kaththi: Nominated
2016: "Pookkalae Sattru Oyivedungal" from I: Won
2017: "Naan Un" from 24: Nominated
2018: "Azhagiye" from Kaatru Veliyidai; "Idhayame" from Velaikkaran: Nominated
SIIMA Awards: Best Lyricist - Tamil
2013: "Asku Laska" from Nanban: Nominated
2014: "Osakka" from Vanakkam Chennai: Nominated
2017: "Munnal Kadhali" from Miruthan: Won
2018: "Azhagiye" from Kaatru Veliyidai: Nominated
2019: "Kurumba" from Tik Tik Tik: Nominated
2021: "Sarvam Thaala Mayam" from Sarvam Thaala Mayam: Nominated
2022: "En Iniya Thanimaiye" from Teddy: Nominated

Mirchi Music Awards South: Best Upcoming Lyricist
2009: "Ododi Poren" from Kandein Kadhalai: Nominated
2010: "Irumbile Oru Irudhaiyam" from Enthiran: Won
Vijay Awards
2011: Best Find of the Year - Enthiran
2012: Best Lyricist - "Enamo Edho" from Ko - Nominated
2014: Best Lyricist - "'Mannadacha Pandu" from Gouravam - Nominated
2014: Best Dialogue Writer - Idharkuthane Aasaipattai Balakumara - Nominated

Research publications
Anitha Narasimhan, Aarthy Anandan, Madhan Karky, Pudhaiyal: A Maze- Based Treasure Hunt Game for Tamil Words, ICLL 2018: 20th International Conference on Language Learning, Mumbai, Feb-2018.
Anitha Narasimhan, Aarthy Anandan, Madhan Karky, Subalalitha CN, Porul: Option Generation and Selection and Scoring Algorithms for a Tamil Flash Card Game, ICLL 2018: 20th International Conference on Language Learning, Mumbai, Feb-2018.
Rajapandian C, Anitha Narasimhan, Aarthy Anandan, Madhan Karky, Alphabet Elimination Al-gorithm and Scoring Model for Guess-the-Word Game: Sorkoa, ICLL 2018: 20th International Conference on Language Learning, Mumbai, Feb-2018.
Suriyah M, Karthikeyan S, Madhan Karky, Ganapathy V, Lyric Basket: Market Basket Analysis Of Tamil Words In Lyrics, International Journal of Pure and Applied Mathematics, Volume:115 No.8, 2017. Elanchezhiyan K, Tamil Selvi E, Revathi N, Shanthi G P, Shireen S, Madhan Karky, Simile Gener- ation, 13th International Tamil Internet Conference, Puducherry, Sep-2014.
Elanchezhiyan.K, TamilSelvi.E, Suriya.M, Karthikeyan.S, MadhanKarky.V, A Min-Max Syllable Compaction Method For Tamil Text-To-Speech ICON-2013, 10th International Conference on Nat- ural Language Processing, C-DAC Noida, Dec-2013.
Karthikeyan.S, NandiniKarky, Elanchezhiyan.K, Rajapandian.C, MadhanKarky.V A Three-Level Genre Classification For Tamil Words 12th International Tamil Internet Conference, Malaysia, Aug- 2013.
Karthikeyan.S, Elanchezhiyan.K, Rajapandian.C, MadhanKarky.V Lyric Object and Spot Indices for Paadal, A Tamil Lyric Search Engine, 12th International Tamil Internet Conference, Malaysia, Aug-2013.
Elanchezhiyan.K, TamilSelvi.E, Karthikeyan.S, Rajapandian.C, MadhanKarky.V, Scoring Models For Tamil Lyrics, 12th International Tamil Internet Conference, Malaysia, Aug-2013.
Elanchezhiyan.K, Karthikeyan.S, Rajapandian.C, MadhanKarky.V Olingoa - A Transliteration Standard for Tamil, 12th International Tamil Internet Conference, Malaysia, Aug-2013.
Rajapandian.C, NandiniKarky, Elanchezhiyan.K, Karthikeyan.S, MadhanKarky.V, Lyric Visualization, 12th Inter- national Tamil Internet Conference, Malaysia, Aug-2013.
Rajapandian.C, Elanchezhiyan.K, Karthikeyan.S, MadhanKarky.V, Paeri: Evolving Tamil Name Generation Algorithm, 12th International Tamil Internet Conference, Malaysia, Aug-2013.
Balaji j, T V Geetha, Ranjani Parthasarathi, Madhan Karky, On Tamil Word Sense Disambiguation using UNL Representation, 9th International Conference on Natural Language Processing, Dec - 2011, Chennai,India.
Uma Maheswari E, Karthika Ranganathan, T V Geetha, Ranjani Parthasarathi, Madhan Karky, Enhancement of Morphological Analyzer with compound, numeral and colloquial word handler, 9th International Conference on Natural Language Processing, Dec - 2011, Chennai, India.
Balaji J, Geetha T V, R. Parthasarathi, Madhan Karky, Anaphora Resolution in Tamil using Univer- sal Networking Language, 5th Indian International Conference on Artificial Intelligence, IICAI-2011 Chennai, India.
J.H. Raju J., I. Reka P., Nandavi K.K., Madhan Karky, On Interestingness Modeling and Humanness Evaluation for Generating Tamil Summary of a Cricket Match, 5th Indian International Conference on Artificial Intelligence, IICAI-2011, Bangalore, India.
G. Beulah S E, Madhan Karky, K. Ranganathan, Suriyah M, Pleasantness Scoring Models for Tamil Lyrics, 5th Indian International Conference on Artificial Intelligence, IICAI-2011, Bangalore, India. Jai Hari R, Indhu Rekha, Nandavi, Madhan Karky, Tamil Summary Generation for a Cricket Match, Tamil Internet Conference 2011, June 2011, Philadelphia, USA.
Giruba B, Geetha T.V, Ranjani P, Madhan Karky, On Detecting Emotions from Tamil Text Using Neural Network, Tamil Internet Conference 2011, June 2011, Philadelphia, USA. Suriyah M, T V Geetha, Ranjani Parthasarathi and Madhan Karky, Special indices for LaaLaLaa lyric Analysis and Generation Framework, Tamil Internet Conference 2011, June 2011, Philadelphia, USA.
Subalalitha C.N, E.Umamaheswari, T V Geetha, Ranjani Parthasarathi and Madhan Karky, Tem- plate based Multilingual Summary Generation, Tamil Internet Conference 2011, June 2011, Philadel- phia, USA.
Karthika Ranganathan, T.V Geetha, Ranjani Parthasarathi and Madhan Karky, Lyric Mining: Word, Rhyme and Concept Co-occurrence Analysis, Tamil Internet Conference 2011, June 2011, Philadelphia, USA.
Elanchezhiyan.K, Karthikeyan.S, T V Geetha, Ranjani Parthasarathi and Madhan Karky, Popularity Based Scoring Model for Tamil Word Games, Tamil Internet Conference 2011, June 2011, Philadelphia, USA.
Elanchezhiyan.K, T V Geetha, Ranjani Parthasarathi and Madhan Karky, Kuralagam, A Concept Relation Based Search Framework for Thirukural, Tamil Internet Conference 2011, June 2011, Philadelphia, USA.
N.M..Revathi, G.P.Shanthi, Elanchezhiyan.K, T V Geetha, Ranjani Parthasarathi and Madhan Karky, An Efficient Tamil Text Compaction System, Tamil Internet Conference 2011, June 2011, Philadelphia, USA.
Elanchezhiyan.K, Karthikeyan.S, T V Geetha, Ranjani Parthasarathi and Madhan Karky, Agaraadhi: A Novel Online Dictionary Framework, Tamil Internet Conference 2011, June 2011, Philadelphia, USA.
Tammaneni, S. and Madhan Karky. FaceWaves: 2D - Facial Expressions based on Tamil Emotion Descriptors. in Tamil Internet Conference in conjunction with World Classical Tamil Conference. 2010. Coimbatore, India.
Tamilarasan and Madhan Karky. FaceWaves: Text to Speech with Lip Synchronisation for a 2D Computer Generated Face. in Tamil Internet Conference in conjunction with World Classical Tamil Conference. 2010. Coimbatore, India.
Raju, J.H., I.R. P, and Madhan Karky. Statistical Analysis and Visualisation of Tamil Usage in Live Text Streams. in Tamil Internet Conference in conjunction with World Classical Tamil Conference. 2010. Coimbatore, India.
Madhan Karky, T.V. Geetha, and R. Varman. FaceWaves: A Tamil Text to Video Framework. in Tamil Internet Conference in conjunction with World Classical Tamil Conference. 2010. Coimbatore, India.
Geetha, T.V., R. Parthasarathi, and Madhan Karky. CoRe - A Framework for Concept Relation Based Advanced Search Engine. in Tamil Internet Conference in conjunction with World Classical Tamil Conference. 2010. Coimbatore, India.
Elanchezian, Geetha, T.V., R. Parthasarathi, and Madhan Karky, Core Search Framework: Concept Based Query Expansion. in Tamil Internet Conference in conjunction with World Classical Tamil Conference. 2010. Coimbatore, India.
Dharmalingam, S. and Madhan Karky. LaaLaLaa - A Tamil Lyric Analysis and Generation Frame- work. in Tamil Internet Conference in conjunction with World Classical Tamil Conference. 2010. Coimbatore, India.
Subalalitha,T.V.Geetha,Ranjani Parthasarathy and Madhan Karky, "CoReX-A Concept Based Se- mantic Indexing Technique", Web Intelligent Systems ICWIS09Y, pp 76–84 8–10 January 2009, Chennai, India.
Madhan Karky Vairamuthu, Sudarsanan Nesamony, Maria E. Orlowska and Shazia W. Sadiq, In- vestigative Queries in Sensor Networks, Workshop on Database Management and Application over Networks in Conjunction with Ninth Asia-Pacific Web Conference and the eighth International Con- ference on Web-Age Information Management, DBMAN 2007 in conjunction with APWeb/WIAM 2007
Sudarsanan Nesamony, Madhan Karky Vairamuthu and Maria E. Orlowska, On the Traversals of Multiple Mobile Sinks in Sensor Networks, Fourteenth IEEE International Conference On Telecom- munications and eighth IEEE Malaysia International Conference on Communications, ICT - MICC 2007
Sudarsanan Nesamony, Madhan Karky Vairamuthu, Maria E. Orlowska and Shazia W. Sadiq, On Sensor Network Segmentation for urban water distribution monitoring, Proceedings of the eighth Asia Pacific Web Conference, Special Sessions on E-Water, pp 974 – 985, APWeb 2006, Jan 16–18, Harbin, China.
Sudarsanan Nesamony, Madhan Karky Vairamuthu and Maria E. Orlowska, On Optimal Route of a Calibrating Mobile Sink in a Wireless Sensor Network, Fourth International Conference on Networked Sensing Systems, INSS 2007
Madhan Karky Vairamuthu, Sudarsanan Nesamony, Maria E. Orlowska and Shazia W. Sadiq, On the Design Issues of Wireless Sensor Networks for Telemetry, Proceedings of the eighth International Workshop on Network-Based Information Systems, pp 138 – 144, NBiS 2005, In Conjunction with sixteenth International Conference on Database and Expert System Applications, DEXA 2005, Aug 22–26, Copenhagen, Denmark.
Madhan Karky Vairamuthu, Sudarsanan Nesamony, Maria E. Orlowska and Shazia W. Sadiq, Chan- nel Allocation Strategy for Wireless Sensor Networks Deployed for Telemetry, Proceedings of the Second International Workshop on Networked Sensing Systems, pp 18 – 23, INSS 2005, Jun 27–28, San Diego, California, USA.

References

Tamil film poets
Indian lyricists
Living people
University of Queensland alumni
College of Engineering, Guindy alumni
1980 births
Tamil screenwriters
Constructed language creators
Natural language processing researchers